Ahijärv is the name of several lakes in Estonia:
Ähijärv, lake in Antsla Parish, Võru County
Küti Ahijärv, lake in Lasva and Võru Parish, Võru County
Lääniste Ahijärv, lake in Võnnu Parish, Tartu County